Scott Alan Mori (October 13, 1941, Janesville, Wisconsin – August 12, 2020) was a swiss and american botanist and plant collector. He specialized in the systematics and ecology of neotropical Lecythidaceae and Amazonian and Guianian floristics.

Biography
Mori graduated in 1964 with a B.S. in biology and conservation from the University of Wisconsin–Stevens Point and in 1968 with an M.S. in botany from the University of Wisconsin–Madison. There he received in 1974 his Ph.D. in botany with dissertation Taxonomic and Anatomic Studies of Gustavia (Lecythidaceae) under the supervision of Hugh H. Iltis. From 1969 to 1974 Mori was an instructor in botany and zoology at the University of Wisconsin Center System at Marshfield. From 1974 to 1975 he was a curator at the Summit Herbarium in the Panama Canal Zone. From 1975 to 1978 he was a research associate at the New York Botanical Garden (NYBG) in the Bronx. From 1978 to 1980 he was a curator at Itabuna, Brazil's Herbário Centro de Pesquisas do Cacau (Herbarium Cacao Research Center, which was founded in 1965). At NYBG, he was an associate curator from 1980 to 1982, a curator from 1982 to 1995, the director of NYBG's Institute of Systematic Botany from 1995 to 2001, and Nathaniel Lord Britton Curator of Botany at the Institute of Systematic Botany from 1998 to 2014, when he retired as curator emeritus.

During his career Mori collected about 28,000 botanical specimens, mostly from the Neotropics and with a focus on lianas and trees. He was an adjunct professor at CUNY, Yale University, and Columbia University. He wrote "130 scientific papers about plants and conservation, dozens of popular articles and blogs, and 12 books."

Mori's 11 doctoral students include Brian Boom and John J. Pipoly III. Mori was married to Carol A. Gracie, a botanist and photographer. She worked with him on botanical research projects in South America. As part of the NYBG's ecotour program, the husband and wife team led dozens of botanical tours to many locations, including "the Amazon, Venezuela, Costa Rica, Ecuador, Galapagos, Hawaii, and various parts of Europe." Upon his death in 2020, Scott Mori was survived by his widow, a son, and two granddaughters, as well as step-children and step-grandchildren.

Awards and honors
 1991–2001 — President of the Torrey Botanical Society
 2002 — Engler Medal in Silver from the International Association of Plant Taxonomy
 2007 — David Fairchild Medal for Plant Exploration from the National Tropical Botanical Garden
 2007 — Asa Gray Award from the American Society of Plant Taxonomists

Selected publications

Articles
 
 
 
 
 
 
 
 
 
 
 
 
  (See Cecropia.)

Books

References

External links

1941 births
2020 deaths
20th-century American botanists
21st-century American botanists
Plant collectors
University of Wisconsin–Stevens Point alumni
University of Wisconsin–Madison alumni